Galvács is a village in Borsod-Abaúj-Zemplén County in northeastern Hungary.  it had a population of 95. But in 2009, it was 91.

References

Populated places in Borsod-Abaúj-Zemplén County